Sinla is a village in Hkamti Township in Hkamti District in the Sagaing Region of northwestern Burma. It lies to the northwest of Laungtauk.

References

External links
Maplandia World Gazetteer

Populated places in Hkamti District
Hkamti Township